Markovo is a rural locality (a village) in Rezhskoye Rural Settlement, Syamzhensky District, Vologda Oblast, Russia. The population was 11 as of 2002.

Geography 
Markovo is located 44 km northeast of Syamzha (the district's administrative centre) by road. Monastyrskaya is the nearest rural locality.

References 

Rural localities in Syamzhensky District